The Women's 1500 metre freestyle competition of the swimming events at the 2015 World Aquatics Championships was held on 3 August with the heats and 4 August with the final.

Records
Prior to the competition, the existing world and championship records were as follows.

The following new records were set during this competition.

Results

Heats
The Heats were held at 10:56.

Final
The final was held on 4 August at 18:05.

References

Women's 1500 metre freestyle
World Aquatics Championships
World Aquatics Championships 1500 metre freestyle